Akeem Hill (born November 1, 1996) is a Barbadian footballer who plays for Barbados Defence Force and the Barbadian national team. He debuted on 3 June 2018, in a 0-0 friendly match against Belize. 

On 8 September 2019, Hill scored his first goal for Barbados against Cayman Islands of the 2019–20 CONCACAF Nations League in a 3–2 defeat.

International

International goals
Scores and results list Barbados' goal tally first.

References

External links
 
 

1996 births
Living people
Barbadian footballers
Barbados international footballers
Notre Dame SC players
Barbados Defence Force SC players
Sportspeople from Bridgetown
Association football forwards